Port Dickson Bypass, Federal Route 5 is a major highway bypass in Port Dickson, Negeri Sembilan, Malaysia

List of junctions

Highways in Malaysia